is a Japanese tarento and violinist represented by J-two.

Filmography

TV and radio series

Advertisements

Films

Discography

Singles

Albums

CD extras

Awards

References

External links
 
 

Japanese entertainers
Japanese violinists
1968 births
Living people
Musicians from Tokyo
21st-century violinists